Paul Gibson may refer to:

 Paul Gibson (broadcaster) (died 1965), former program host for WBBM (AM) Radio in Chicago
 Paul Gibson (wide receiver) (1948–1975), wide receiver in the National Football League
 Paul Gibson (end) (1924–1999), American football end
 Paul Gibson (baseball) (born 1960), former Major League Baseball pitcher
 Paul Gibson (footballer) (born 1976), English football goalkeeper who most notably played for Manchester United
 Paul Gibson (politician) (born 1944), Australian politician and rugby league footballer of the 1960s and 1970s
 Paul Gibson Jr. (1927–2014), American airline executive and New York City deputy mayor

See also
 Gibson The Paul, an electric guitar made by Gibson